Schloss Laufen am Rheinfall is a railway station in the Swiss canton of Zürich and municipality of Laufen-Uhwiesen. The station is overlooked by Schloss Laufen ("Laufen Castle") and in turn overlooks the famous Rhine Falls, from which it derives its name. It is located on the Swiss Federal Railway's Rheinfall line and is served by Zürich S-Bahn lines S12 and S33.

The station is situated to the west of Schloss Laufen and its single platform overlooks the Rhine immediately below the falls. Immediately to the east of the station the railway line tunnels under the castle and then crosses the Rhine above the falls on a bridge that also carries pedestrian traffic. The station is linked to the castle by a walkway, and is mostly used by visitors to the castle and falls.

In 2012, the government of the canton of Zürich proposed that Schloss Laufen am Rheinfall station should be closed from 2015, as it is unable to be adapted for disabled access and is too short to handle the longer trains that are to be introduced then. An alternative of relocating the station onto the nearby Rhine bridge was considered too expensive. The proposal has encountered significant opposition in the cantonal council.

Schloss Laufen am Rheinfall station is one of two stations intended to serve the Rhine Falls, the other being Neuhausen Rheinfall station on the opposite bank of the river.

Gallery

References

External links 
 

Schloss Laufen am Rheinfall
Schloss Laufen am Rheinfall